The 1900 Michigan State Normal Normalites football team represented Michigan State Normal College (later renamed Eastern Michigan University) during the 1900 college football season.  The team compiled a record of 0–4, failed to score a point, and was outscored by a combined total of 81 to 0. Austin F. Jones was the team captain.

In early September 1900, Clayton Teetzel was hired as Michigan State Normal's director of athletics and football coach. Teetzel was 24 years old at the time of his hiring; he had played football for the University of Michigan from 1897 to 1899 before graduating with a law degree in 1900.

By October 2, 1900, the enrollment at Michigan State Normal had reached 750 students. Another 200 or 300 students were expected by the end of the week. The school's prominence in the ranks of teaching school's was advanced by the Journal of Pedagogy's 1900 move of its headquarters from Syracuse, New York, to Ypsilanti.

Schedule

References

Michigan State Normal
Eastern Michigan Eagles football seasons
Michigan State Normal Normalites football